The Radcliffe Science Library (RSL) is the main teaching and research science library at the University of Oxford in Oxford, England. Being officially part of the Bodleian Libraries, the library holds the Legal Deposit material for the sciences and is thus entitled to receive a copy of all British scientific publications.

In December 2018 it was announced that the premises would be used as the basis of a new non-residential graduate college of the university, Reuben College, alongside thelibrary. The library closed for refurbishment in December 2019 and will reopen for October 2023.  RSL library stock and services are now being provided temporarily at the Vere Harmsworth Library in the Rothermere American Institute.

History
The scientific books housed in the Radcliffe Camera were transferred to the Oxford University Museum of Natural History in 1861. On land next to the museum (on the corner of Parks Road and South Parks Road) a new library building opened in 1901, the Radcliffe Library. Like a number of other buildings in Oxford, the library was named after John Radcliffe, a major benefactor of the university.

In 1927, the library lost its independence, for financial efficiency becoming part of the Bodleian Library. The library took on its current name, the Radcliffe Science Library, and gained the right as a legal deposit library to receive a copy of all new British scientific publications.

The library has doors with relief wood carvings by Don Potter, undertaken while he was studying with the sculptor Eric Gill.

With the construction of a basement in the 1970s, part of the building was used to form The Hooke Library, a (separate) science lending library for undergraduates, which was named after Robert Hooke, a scientist who worked in Oxford. The Hooke Library housed its collection in the ground floor of the Abbot's Kitchen which was originally part of the University Museum and on the staircase at the eastern end of the Jackson Wing of the RSL. The area which housed the Hooke Library collection became part of the RSL, with the ground floor of the Abbot's Kitchen transformed into a refreshment area and a training room.

Until 2007, the library was a reference library rather than a lending library. During 2007 the building and collection of the Hooke Library was integrated into the RSL.

The building
The RSL building consists of three parts, developed as expansion of the library was necessary:

 The Jackson Wing, parallel to South Parks Road, is Grade II listed. Designed by Sir Thomas Jackson it opened in 1901. This wing currently houses parts of the RSL and formerly housed part of the Hooke Library on the staircase at its east end. It is arranged over 3 floors, all above ground, with two reading rooms and administration offices.
 The Worthington Wing, parallel to Parks Road, was designed as an extension to the Jackson Wing in 1934 by Hubert Worthington. The wing extends to the north of the western end of the Jackson Wing and contains two reading rooms, on the first and second floors, and the library entrance hall on the ground floor.
 The Lankester Room and Main Stack, a two-storey extension under the lawn of the museum, built 1972–5. The Lankester Room is a large reading room of the library containing the book collection. The stack contains additional storage for library materials - readers do not have direct access to this, but can request items from it.

Gallery

See also
 Bodleian Libraries
 Abbot's Kitchen, Oxford, next to the RSL

References

Further reading
 
 Information boards, concerning the 2007 transformation

External links

 Radcliffe Science Library website

1861 establishments in England
Libraries of the University of Oxford
Science and technology in Oxfordshire
Deposit libraries
Science libraries
Library buildings completed in 1901
Library buildings completed in 1934
Library buildings completed in 1975
Reuben College, Oxford